Suomen Naisyhdistys, in Swedish Finsk kvinnoförening, is a Finnish women's rights organisation. It was founded in 1884, and is the oldest women's movement organisation in Finland. The organization was the publisher of a women's magazine, Koti ja Yhteiskunta (1889–1911), which was edited by Alexandra Gripenberg. It is a member of the International Alliance of Women, that has general consultative status with the United Nations.

References

Feminist organisations in Finland
1880s establishments in Finland
1884 establishments in the Russian Empire
Voter rights and suffrage organizations
Women's suffrage in Finland